The  Motorola Jazz  is a pager produced by Motorola between 1991 and 1993 which uses the FLEX pager protocol. 

It was available in Slate Gray, Arctic White, Ocean Blue and transparent colors. The Jazz was the smallest messaging pager at the time of its release, ran on a single AAA battery and had a green LCD. The user could also opt for news updates from the service provider.

See also
Motorola MINITOR pager
Motorola StarTAC
Motorola DynaTAC
Motorola MicroTAC
Pager

Jazz